Yamghurchi Khan (died 1555) was a ruler of the Astrakhan Khanate since the 1540s. He occupied the throne with the help of the Nogay nobility. In the battle of Xacitarxan in 1554 the Russians defeated him and forced him to escape to lands behind the Terek river. In 1555 he was killed in dissension with Nogays. For uncertainties and additional information see the second part of List of Astrakhan khans.

1555 deaths
Khans of Astrakhan
Year of birth unknown